Park Jae-hyuk (born 3 June 1963) is a South Korean alpine skier. He competed in three events at the 1988 Winter Olympics.

References

1963 births
Living people
South Korean male alpine skiers
Olympic alpine skiers of South Korea
Alpine skiers at the 1988 Winter Olympics
Place of birth missing (living people)
Asian Games medalists in alpine skiing
Asian Games silver medalists for South Korea
Asian Games bronze medalists for South Korea
Alpine skiers at the 1986 Asian Winter Games
Medalists at the 1986 Asian Winter Games
20th-century South Korean people